Boomtown New Orleans (formerly Boomtown Westbank) is a casino hotel located on the West Bank of Jefferson Parish in Harvey, Louisiana. It is on a  site. It is owned by Gaming and Leisure Properties and operated by Penn Entertainment.

Casino
Boomtown is the largest riverboat casino in Southeast Louisiana since its acquisition of one of the twin River City Casino riverboats in 1998. It has over 1,500 slots and video poker games, 30 table games on the first floor and is open 24 hours a day.

Amenities
Boomtown has a five-story hotel with 150 rooms.

The facility offers four different dining options: Bayou Market Buffet, Bayou Market Express, Asia and Pier 4. Entertainment options are Boomer's Nightclub where local cover bands (i.e. The Chee-Weez) and national acts come to perform and special event parties. There's also the ETC gift shop.

History
Boomtown, Inc. opened its Boomtown Westbank casino on August 6, 1994.

The property became part of Hollywood Park, Inc. (later Pinnacle Entertainment) with its purchase in 1997 of Boomtown, Inc.

In 2006, Pinnacle approved a major expansion for Boomtown New Orleans, expected to cost $145 million, including a 200-room, four-star hotel with a spa and salon, an expansion of the Boomers nightclub, an Asian restaurant, additional meeting space, a new employee dining area, and an expansion of the buffet. The expansion was supposed to start in the first quarter of 2007 and be finished by the second quarter of 2008.

A renewed expansion plan was announced in 2012, including a $20-million, 150-room hotel, fitness center, meeting rooms and 250 new parking spaces. The hotel opened on January 21, 2015.

In 2016, the property was sold to Gaming and Leisure Properties along with almost all of Pinnacle's real estate assets, and leased back to Pinnacle. Penn National Gaming (now Penn Entertainment) acquired Boomtown's operations in 2018, as part of the acquisition of Pinnacle.

See also
 Boomtown Biloxi
 Boomtown Bossier City
 Boomtown Reno
 Silverton Las Vegas

References

External links
 
 Boomtown Casino plans $200M expansion in Harvey

1994 establishments in Louisiana
Casino hotels
Casinos completed in 1994
Casinos in Louisiana
Hotel buildings completed in 2015
Hotels in New Orleans
Riverboat casinos